Salvador 'Salva' Mejías López (born 26 April 1963 in Cádiz, Andalusia) is a Spanish former footballer who played as a forward. His older brother José was also a footballer, and they coincided in several clubs during their careers.

References

External links

Stats at Cadistas1910 
Celta de Vigo biography 

1963 births
Living people
Spanish footballers
Footballers from Cádiz
Association football forwards
La Liga players
Segunda División players
Segunda División B players
Tercera División players
Cádiz CF B players
CD San Fernando players
Cádiz CF players
Real Murcia players
RC Celta de Vigo players
Elche CF players
Spain under-21 international footballers